Amedeo Grillo (5 June 1901 – 13 July 1979) was an Italian boxer who competed in the 1924 Summer Olympics. He was born in La Spezia. In 1924, he was eliminated in the second round of the light heavyweight class after losing his fight to Georges Rossignon.

References

External links
 

1901 births
1979 deaths
People from La Spezia
Light-heavyweight boxers
Olympic boxers of Italy
Boxers at the 1924 Summer Olympics
Italian male boxers
Sportspeople from the Province of La Spezia
20th-century Italian people